Fred Chaplin (1909-1974)  was an Australian rugby league footballer who played in the 1930s for South Sydney and Canterbury-Bankstown.  Chaplin was a foundation player for Canterbury-Bankstown.

Playing career
Chaplin began his career at South Sydney and played a total of 3 seasons at the club.

In 1935, Chaplin joined newly admitted Canterbury-Bankstown and played in the club first ever game against North Sydney at North Sydney Oval on 25 April 1935.  Chaplin played a total of 12 games for the club as Canterbury finished second last on the table in its inaugural year.

In 1936, Chaplin only managed to play 2 games for Canterbury and his final game in first grade was against Balmain in Round 15 1936 at the Sydney Cricket Ground.

References

South Sydney Rabbitohs players
Canterbury-Bankstown Bulldogs players
Rugby league players from Sydney
Rugby league props
Rugby league second-rows
1909 births
1974 deaths